Langshan, also known as Wolf Mountains or Lang Mountains, is a mountain range at the northwest corner of the Ordos Loop in Inner Mongolia, China. It is sometimes reckoned as part of the Yin Mountains.

Geography
The Wolf Mountains run from southwest to northeast. They force the Yellow River to turn from north to east. To the northwest is the Gobi Desert; to the southeast, between it and the Yellow River, is an irrigated area. Its northeast end continues as the Yin Mountains.

Mountain ranges of Inner Mongolia